Armonia Bordes is a French politician, who, from 1999 until 2004, was a Member of the European Parliament representing France. She was elected as a joint candidate for the Revolutionary Communist League and Workers' Struggle.

Parliamentary service
Member, Committee on Women's Rights and Equal Opportunities (1999-2002, 2002–2004)
Member, Committee on Economic and Monetary Affairs (1999-2002, 2002–2004)
Member, Delegations to the parliamentary cooperation committees and delegations for relations with Kazakhstan, Kyrgyzstan, Uzbekistan, Tajikistan, Turkmenistan and Mongolia (1999-2002)
Member, Delegation to the EU-Kazakhstan, EU-Kyrgyzstan and EU-Uzbekistan Parliamentary Cooperation Committees and Delegation for relations with Tajikistan, Turkmenistan and Mongolia (2002-2004)

References

Living people
1945 births
Revolutionary Communist League (France) MEPs
Workers' Struggle MEPs
Politicians from Toulouse
MEPs for France 1999–2004